The 2017 Western Athletic Conference women's soccer tournament was the postseason women's soccer tournament for the Western Athletic Conference held from November 1–5, 2017. The five match tournament took place at GCU Stadium in Phoenix on the campus of Grand Canyon University. The six-team single-elimination tournament consisted of three rounds based on seeding from regular season conference play. The defending champions were the Seattle Redhawks, but they failed to defend their title after losing the penalty shoot-out tiebreaking procedure following a tie with the Utah Valley Wolverines in the final. This was the second WAC women's soccer tournament championship for the Utah Valley women's soccer program and the first for first-year head coach Chris Lemay.

Seeds
The top six teams qualify for the tournament. Teams receive three points for each win and one point for each tie within their seven-game conference schedule. Teams will be seeded by total points earned, with a tiebreaker system to seed teams with identical conference records.  The top two seeds will receive byes to the semifinals.

Bracket

Schedule

First round

Semifinals

Final

Statistics

Goalscorers 

2 Goals
 McKenzie Cook - Grand Canyon
 Natasha Howe - Seattle

1 Goal
 Sarah Bonney - UTRGV
 Siri Dahl - Utah Valley
 Laura Hooper - Seattle
 Breanna McCarter - Utah Valley
 Jessie Ray - Seattle
 Holly Rothering - Seattle

References 

tournament 2017
Western Athletic Conference Women's Soccer